Paul Zanette (born April 8, 1988) is a Canadian-Italian professional ice hockey player. He is currently an unrestricted free agent who most recently played for the Indy Fuel of the ECHL. In 2011, while playing for the Niagara University Purple Eagles, Zanette was named the Atlantic Hockey Player of the Year, and was a selected as a finalist for the Hobey Baker Award.

Playing career
Not selected in the NHL draft in 2011, Zanette signed as a free agent with the Rockford Ice Hogs of the American Hockey League for the 2011–12 season, where he started the season until assigned to the Toledo Walleye of the ECHL.

With no substantial North American offers, he opted for HC Asiago of the Italian Serie A.

After two successful seasons with Asiago, Zanette left as a free agent, along with brother Marc, to sign with Italian-based club HC Bolzano of the Austrian Hockey League on August 9, 2014. Zanette successfully completed his trial and signed a one-year contract while his brother failed to catch on.

After his contract expired with Asiago, Zanette joined Scottish club, Edinburgh Capitals of the Elite Ice Hockey League, on a two-year contract. After just 35 games, Zanette's contract was terminated "by mutual consent."  He then re-joined former club, HC Asiago, for the balance of the Italian 2015–16 season.

On July 21, 2016, Zanette returned to North America, signing a one-year ECHL contract with the Greenville Swamp Rabbits, where he scored 20 points before being traded to the Indy Fuel on January 12, 2017.

Career statistics

Regular season and playoffs

International

Awards and honours

References

External links

1988 births
Living people
Asiago Hockey 1935 players
Bolzano HC players
Canadian ice hockey forwards
Edinburgh Capitals players
Greenville Swamp Rabbits players
Hamilton Bulldogs (AHL) players
Indy Fuel players
Italian ice hockey forwards
Niagara Purple Eagles men's ice hockey players
Rockford IceHogs (AHL) players
Toledo Walleye players
Canadian people of Italian descent
Naturalised citizens of Italy
Canadian expatriate ice hockey players in Scotland
Canadian expatriate ice hockey players in the United States
AHCA Division I men's ice hockey All-Americans
Italian expatriate sportspeople in the United States
Italian expatriate ice hockey people
Naturalised sports competitors